The 8th constituency of Moselle is a French legislative constituency in the Moselle département.

Description

Moselle's 8th constituency was radically altered following boundary changes prior to the 2012 elections so that only Fameck remained from its previous incarnation. The resulting seat consists on a slither of territory between the river Moselle and the border with Meurthe-et-Moselle to the west.

The seat was won easily by Socialist Michel Liebgott in the 2012 elections after a National Front candidate secured a place in the second round.

Historic Representation

Election results

2022

2017

2012

 
 
 
 
 
|-
| colspan="8" bgcolor="#E9E9E9"|
|-

Sources
Official results of French elections from 2002: "Résultats électoraux officiels en France" (in French).

8